Sir John Spencer (9 January 1599) was an English nobleman, politician, landowner, sheriff, knight, and MP from the Spencer family.

Life and family 
Spencer was the son of Sir John Spencer (died 1586) of Althorp, Northamptonshire, and his wife Katherine Kitson, daughter of Sir Thomas Kitson of Hengrave, Suffolk. Educated at Trinity College, Cambridge, he then trained in the law at the Middle Temple. He succeeded his father in 1586, inheriting estates at Wormleighton, Warwickshire, and Althorp, Northamptonshire, and was knighted in 1588.

He was appointed a Justice of the Peace for Bedfordshire in 1577 and for Northamptonshire in 1584. He was Sheriff of Northamptonshire for the year 1578–79 and again for 1590–91. He was elected as one of the members of parliament for Northampton in 1572.

Spencer died on 9 January 1600 and was buried in St Mary the Virgin Church, Great Brington, the parish church for Althorp.

His monument was made by Joseph Hollemans, a Dutch sculptor residing in Burton-on-Trent.

Marriage and issue 
Spencer married Mary Catlyn, the only daughter and heiress of Sir Robert Catlin, who brought him estates in both Leicestershire and Northamptonshire. They had one son, Robert, who became the first Baron Spencer of Wormleighton.

References

External links
 

1549 births
1600 deaths
People from West Northamptonshire District
John
High Sheriffs of Northamptonshire
English MPs 1572–1583
16th-century English landowners
Year of birth uncertain
Alumni of Trinity College, Cambridge
Members of the Middle Temple